Love Hurts (Dutch Hartverscheurend) is a 1993 Dutch drama film directed by Mijke de Jong. At the 1993 Netherlands Film Festival, de Jong won the Prijs van de Nederlandse Filmkritiek for the film.

Plot
In 1990s Amsterdam, Loe and Bob are in a relationship, but wanting different things. Loe is a singer who likes to party and who is also engaged in migrant support. Bob is a lawyer focused on his career. As the film progresses, the tensions in the relationship become exposed.

Cast
Marieke Heebink as Loe
Mark Rietman as Bob
André Arend van de Noord as Johnny
Tanar Catalpinar as Kemal
Roef Ragas	as Maarten
Gerrit Albada as Cameraman
Karina De Koning as Judge
Jan Eilander as Interviewer
Javier Hidalgo as Ricardo
Mientje Kleijer as Marcia
Jerónimo Molero as Waiter
Ruud Van der Heyde	as Soundman

Critical response 
The critical response to the film was mixed. Variety enjoyed the "total immersion in the couple’s rocky rapport" and praised the camerawork of Joost Van Starrenburg as well as the editing by Menno Boerema.
 In contrast, Time Out summed it up as a "well-meaning, not unintelligent, but rather tiresome look at the volatile relationship of two ill-matched lovers".

References

External links 
 

1993 films
1990s Dutch-language films
1993 drama films
Films directed by Mijke de Jong
Dutch drama films